Michel Seydoux (born 11 September 1947) is a French businessman and film producer. He is also the former president and chairman of French professional football club Lille OSC.

In 1975-1976, Seydoux worked with director Alejandro Jodorowsky on a film adaptation of Frank Herbert's Dune. The movie was never made due to lack of financing; the story of the project is told in Jodorowsky's Dune, which prominently features Seydoux.

In 1997 he was a member of the jury at the 20th Moscow International Film Festival.

Family
Seydoux is the grandson of scientist Marcel Schlumberger and has two brothers; Jérôme and Nicolas. Jérôme is a shareholder on football club Olympique Lyonnais. Seydoux is the grand-uncle of actress Léa Seydoux.

Selected filmography 
 Lily, aime-moi (1975)
 F comme Fairbanks (1976)
 Shadow of the Castles (1977)
 Don Giovanni (1979)
 Cyrano de Bergerac (1990)
 Close to Eden (1991)
 Smoking/No Smoking (1993)
 Burnt by the Sun (1994)
 The Barber of Siberia (1998)
 Leaving (2009)
 Pater (2011)
 The Dance of Reality (2013)
 The Sense of Wonder (2015)
 Living and Knowing You're Alive (2019)
 Heart of Oak (2022; also co-director)

References

External links
 
 Movies produced by Michel Seydoux

1947 births
French film producers
Alsatian people
French football chairmen and investors
Living people
Sportspeople from Paris